James Metcalf may refer to:

 Jim Metcalf (footballer) (1898–1975), English footballer
 Jim Metcalf (1920–1977), American journalist in Louisiana
 James Metcalf (artist) (1925–2012), American sculptor and artist
 JJ Metcalf (born 1988), English boxer

See also
 James Medcalf (1895–1980), English footballer
 James Metcalfe (disambiguation)
 Metcalf (disambiguation)